Linnonmaa is a Finnish surname. Notable people with the surname include:

Harri Linnonmaa (born 1946), Finnish ice hockey player
Jaajo Linnonmaa (born 1978), Finnish radio personality and actor
Olavi Linnonmaa (1920–1995), Finnish cyclist

Finnish-language surnames